The 2014–15 Wyoming Cowgirls basketball team represents University of Wyoming in the 2014–15 college basketball season. The Cowgirls, led by twelfth year head coach Joe Legerski. The Cowgirls played their home games at the Arena-Auditorium and were members of the Mountain West Conference. They finish the season 16–14, 10–8 in Mountain West play for a tie to finish in fifth place. They advance to the quarterfinals of the 2015 Mountain West Conference women's basketball tournament where they lost to Fresno State in the quarterfinals.

Roster

Schedule

|-
!colspan=9 style="background:#492f24; color:#ffc425;"| Regular Season

|-
!colspan=9 style="background:#492f24; color:#ffc425;"| Mountain West tournament

See also
2014–15 Wyoming Cowboys basketball team

References 

Wyoming
Wyoming Cowgirls basketball seasons
Wyoming Cowgirls
Wyoming Cowgirls